The COVID-19 pandemic is a global pandemic caused by the COVID-19 virus.

Statistics 

 Statistics of the COVID-19 pandemic
 COVID-19 pandemic cases
 COVID-19 pandemic deaths

Location

Geography 

 COVID-19 pandemic in Africa
 COVID-19 pandemic in Antarctica
 COVID-19 pandemic in Asia
 COVID-19 pandemic in Europe
 COVID-19 pandemic in North America
 COVID-19 pandemic in Oceania
 COVID-19 pandemic in South America

See Category:COVID-19 pandemic by country and Category:COVID-19 pandemic by dependent territory for more specific geographic locations

Facilities 

 Impact of the COVID-19 pandemic on hospitals
 Impact of the COVID-19 pandemic on long-term care facilities
 Impact of the COVID-19 pandemic on prisons

See Category:Ships involved in the COVID-19 pandemic for the role of sea vessels

Response 

 Charitable activities related to the COVID-19 pandemic
 Face masks during the COVID-19 pandemic
 Public health mitigation of COVID-19
 Social distancing measures related to the COVID-19 pandemic
 Wikipedia coverage of the COVID-19 pandemic
 Workplace hazard controls for COVID-19

Research and science 

 Impact of the COVID-19 pandemic on science and technology
 COVID-19 drug repurposing research
 Investigations into the origin of COVID-19
 Treatment and management of COVID-19

Vaccinations 

 COVID-19 vaccine
 COVID-19 vaccine clinical research
 Deployment of COVID-19 vaccines
 History of COVID-19 vaccine development
 COVID-19 vaccine misinformation and hesitancy
 Vaccine passports during the COVID-19 pandemic

Economic impact 

 Economic impact of the COVID-19 pandemic

By sector 

 Financial market impact of the COVID-19 pandemic
 Impact of the COVID-19 pandemic on the food industry
 Impact of the COVID-19 pandemic on journalism
 Impact of the COVID-19 pandemic on the military
 Impact of the COVID-19 pandemic on retail
 Impact of the COVID-19 pandemic on tourism

Related issues 

 2020–present global chip shortage

 2020s commodities boom
 2021–2022 inflation surge
 COVID-19 recession
 2021–2022 global supply chain crisis
 Shortages related to the COVID-19 pandemic
 Great Resignation

Society 

 Social impact of the COVID-19 pandemic
 COVID-19 pandemic baby bust
 Impact of the COVID-19 pandemic on education
 Human rights issues related to the COVID-19 pandemic
 Protests against responses to the COVID-19 pandemic
 Social stigma associated with COVID-19
 Xenophobia and racism related to the COVID-19 pandemic

By group 

 Impact of the COVID-19 pandemic on children
 Impact of the COVID-19 pandemic on people with disabilities
 Impact of the COVID-19 pandemic on domestic violence
 Gendered impact of the COVID-19 pandemic
 Impact of the COVID-19 pandemic on the LGBT community
 Impact of the COVID-19 pandemic on migration
 Impact of the COVID-19 pandemic on religion

Cultural influence 

 COVID-19 pandemic in popular culture
 Impact of the COVID-19 pandemic on the arts and cultural heritage
 Impact of the COVID-19 pandemic on cinema
 Impact of the COVID-19 pandemic on the performing arts
 Impact of the COVID-19 pandemic on social media
 Impact of the COVID-19 pandemic on sports
 Impact of the COVID-19 pandemic on television

COVID-19 pandemic
Outlines of history and events
Outlines of health and fitness
Wikipedia outlines